Wage Earners' Welfare Board is a government welfare board that is responsible for the welfare of expatriat Bangladesh workers and is located in Dhaka, Bangladesh.

History
The Wage Earners' Welfare Board was established in 1990 to manage the Wages Earners’ Welfare Fund which was started together. It is managed by an intergovernmental official run board. The board was made into a statutory organisation through the Wage Earners’ Welfare Board law-2016. The board was further strengthened through The Expatriate Welfare Board Act, 2017. It is under the Ministry of Expatriates' Welfare and Overseas Employment of the government of Bangladesh. It works as a subsidiary of Bureau of Manpower Employment and Training.

References

Government agencies of Bangladesh
1990 establishments in Bangladesh
Organisations based in Dhaka
Bangladeshi diaspora
Government agencies established in 1990